George "Comanche Boy" Tahdooahnippah (born December 3, 1978) is an American professional boxer. He has held the WBC Continental Americas middleweight and Native American Boxing Council super middleweight titles. He also works as an environment and Diabetes specialist.

Early life
Tahdooahnippah is a member of the Comanche Nation and is also Choctaw. He won the honor as a Cadet Greco-Roman All-American, placing 7th in the United States. He also represented Oklahoma as an "Oklahoma All Star" and toured Japan before receiving a full wrestling scholarship to Delaware State University.

Kickboxer
At the age of 23, he became an amateur kickboxer, winning the North Texas light heavyweight title. He was also the runner-up at the 2002 "Sansho-Kickboxing World Championships". He participated in the Original Toughman competition, where he won the light heavyweight championship.

Professional boxing career
He did not have his first professional boxing match until age 25. He eventually teamed with manager Bobby Dobbs. He has worked with world class trainers such as Shadeed Suluki and David Vaughn. He currently trains at the Mad Man Boxing Gym in Elgin, OK.

NABC Super Middleweight Championship
On September 12, 2008, Tahdooahnippah defeated Jonathan Corn with a seventh round TKO to win the vacant Native American Boxing Council Super Middleweight Championship.

Professional boxing record

|- style="margin:0.5em auto; font-size:95%;"
|align="center" colspan=8|28 Wins (21 knockouts), 0 Losses, 1 Draw
|- style="margin:0.5em auto; font-size:95%;"
|align=center style="border-style: none none solid solid; background: #e3e3e3"|Res.
|align=center style="border-style: none none solid solid; background: #e3e3e3"|Record
|align=center style="border-style: none none solid solid; background: #e3e3e3"|Opponent
|align=center style="border-style: none none solid solid; background: #e3e3e3"|Type
|align=center style="border-style: none none solid solid; background: #e3e3e3"|Rd., Time
|align=center style="border-style: none none solid solid; background: #e3e3e3"|Date
|align=center style="border-style: none none solid solid; background: #e3e3e3"|Location
|align=center style="border-style: none none solid solid; background: #e3e3e3"|Notes
|-align=center
|- style="margin:0.5em auto; font-size:90%;"
| Win || 28-0-1 ||align=left| Jimmy Holmes
|KO || 1st (2:28) of 10  || July 16, 2011 || align=left|Comanche Nation Casino, Lawton, Oklahoma||vacant WBC Continental Americas title 
|align=left|
|-align=center
|- style="margin:0.5em auto; font-size:90%;"
| Win || 27-0-1 ||align=left| Thomas Longacre
|UD || 6 of 6  || February 25, 2011 || align=left|Hard Rock Hotel & Casino, Tulsa, Oklahoma
|align=left|
|-align=center
|- style="margin:0.5em auto; font-size:90%;"
| Win || 26-0-1 ||align=left| Eloy Suarez
|UD || 6 of 6  || January 13, 2011 || align=left|Remington Park, Oklahoma City, Oklahoma
|align=left|
|-align=center
|- style="margin:0.5em auto; font-size:90%;"
|Win || 25-0-1 || align=left| Steve Walker
|TKO || 2 (0:37) of 6|| November 12, 2010 || align=left|Hard Rock Hotel & Casino, Tulsa, Oklahoma
|align=left|
|-align=center
|- style="margin:0.5em auto; font-size:90%;"
|Win || 24-0-1 || align=left| Dezi Ford
|TKO || 1 (2:59) of 6|| July 8, 2010 || align=left|Remington Park, Oklahoma City, Oklahoma
|align=left|
|-align=center
|- style="margin:0.5em auto; font-size:90%;"
|Win || 23-0-1 || align=left| Dave Saunders
|UD || 6 of 6 || April 22, 2010 || align=left|Crowne Plaza Hotel, Tulsa, Oklahoma
|align=left|
|-align=center

References

External links
 archived from the original.

1978 births
Boxers from Oklahoma
Native American boxers
Super-middleweight boxers
Comanche people
Living people
Sportspeople from Lawton, Oklahoma
Delaware State University alumni
American male boxers